is a railway station on the Ban'etsu West Line in Kitakata, Fukushima Prefecture,  Japan, operated by East Japan Railway Company (JR East).

Lines
Shiokawa Station is served by the Ban'etsu West Line, and is located 75.1 rail kilometers from the official starting point of the line at Kōriyama Station.

Station layout
Shiokawa Station has a single island platform and a single side platform connected to the station building by an overhead passageway.

Platforms

History
Shiokawa Station opened on January 20, 1904. The station was absorbed into the JR East network upon the privatization of the Japanese National Railways (JNR) on April 1, 1987.

Surrounding area
 former Shiokawa Town Hall
 Japan National Route 121
 Shiokawa Post Office

External links

 JR East Station information 

Railway stations in Fukushima Prefecture
Ban'etsu West Line
Railway stations in Japan opened in 1904